Jeanine Nothnagel (born 26 April 1963) is a South African politician who has been a Member of the National Assembly of South Africa since April 2022. Nothnagel is a member of the African National Congress, South Africa's governing party.

Education
Nothnagel holds a Doctor of Business Administration (DBA) from the Central University of Technology in Bloemfontein, Free State.

Political career
Nothnagel was elected as an ANC councillor in the Mangaung Metropolitan Municipality in 2006. From 2016 to 2021, she served as a member of the mayoral committee (MMC). On her 59th birthday, Nothnagel was sworn in as a Member of Parliament for the ANC.

References

External links
Profile at Parliament of South Africa

Living people
1963 births
Afrikaner people
Members of the National Assembly of South Africa
Women members of the National Assembly of South Africa
African National Congress politicians